Lou Chibbaro Jr. is an American journalist best known for his efforts as senior news writer for the Washington Blade to chronicle the gay rights movement in the Washington metropolitan area and nationwide in the United States.

Biography

Raised on Long Island, Chibbaro moved to Washington, D.C., in the early 1970s after completing an undergraduate degree. Chibbaro first came to Washington, D.C. in 1971 while a student a SUNY Brockport; he returned in 1975 to work and to earn a graduate degree in broadcast journalism.

In 1975, he came out to his parents about his sexuality.  After telling them in person, he followed up his announcement with a "Dear Mom and Dad" letter that he hoped would help them understand.  As he wrote them, "There are many who have advised me never to tell my parents I'm gay. I think it's to your credit that I can't do this. I just can't and won't live a lie!" While his mother was initially upset and his father worried about the prospects for his career if anyone found out that he was gay, his parents ultimately accepted his sexual orientation.

Career

Lou Chibbaro Jr. wrote his earliest articles in the Washington Blade as a volunteer and under the pseudonym "Lou Romano", as at the time that he first began writing for the Blade, journalism careers could be ruined for being associated with a gay newspaper.  To earn a living, Chibbaro worked first at Trends Publishing and then at American Public Power Association.  In 1978, two years after he started volunteering at the Blade, he became self-employed as the publisher of a public utility newsletter; it was at that time that he dropped the use of the pseudonym in favor of using his real name. His decision to use his real name was spurred by a particularly gruesome event that he reported on in which 9 men died in a fire in a rundown adult theater that drove home to him the dangers of living a secret life.

As of 1984, he became a paid staff member.  Even then, the income was not enough to live on and Chibbaro had to supplement his income from the newspaper by working as a cab driver for Red Top Cabs.  During his time at the Blade, he covered such wide-ranging stories as the AIDS epidemic; political protests; murders, including the 1976 murder of one of the congressional staff members of Rep. Morris Udall at a gay cruising area; Congressional members who were hiring male prostitutes; federal efforts targeting gay men for dismissal from their government jobs; to a gay ex-Marine who foiled an assassination attempt on the life of President Gerald Ford by grabbing the would-be assassins gun and deflecting the shot.

Awards

National
In 2008, Chibbaro received the National Lesbian and Gay Journalists Association's Sarah Pettit Memorial Award for Excellence in LGBT Media Second Place Award.

He was inducted into the Society of Professional Journalists' Washington Pro Chapter's Hall of Fame in 2011, the first member of the LGBT community to do so, joining acclaimed journalists such as Helen Thomas and Bob Woodward.

Local Awards

In 2009, Chibbaro received the Rainbow History Project's Community Pioneers Award.

In 2010, Chibbaro received the Gay and Lesbian Activists Alliance's Distinguished Service Award.

Selected works

References

Further reading

Interviews

Archival Resources
 Washington Blade Lou Chibbaro senior reporter files, 1980-2001 are housed in the Special Collections Research Center, Gelman Library at the George Washington University.
  Frank Kameny Papers are housed at the Library of Congress. Includes correspondence between Kameny and Chibbaro between 1975-1978 and 1987-1991.

Journalists from Washington, D.C.
American LGBT writers
American LGBT journalists
Living people
People from Long Island
Year of birth missing (living people)